Balmoral (from the ) is the most southern of ten district electoral areas (DEA) in Belfast, Northern Ireland. The district elects five members to Belfast City Council and contains the wards of Belvoir; Finaghy; Malone; Musgrave; Windsor; and Upper Malone. Balmoral, along with neighbouring Botanic, forms the greater part of the Belfast South constituencies for the Northern Ireland Assembly and UK Parliament.

The district is bounded to the west and south west by the M1 Motorway, to east and south east by the River Lagan, to the east and north east by the Malone Road and to the north by Belfast City Hospital, Queen's University Belfast and Royal Victoria Hospital.

The Lisburn Road is the main arterial route through the centre of the district, which also contains a number of public facilities including: the King's Hall conference and exhibition centre, the Musgrave Park Hospital, Sir Thomas and Lady Dixon Park and Windsor Park, the home ground of the Northern Ireland national football team. It is served by the Adelaide, Balmoral and Finaghy railway stations.

History
The DEA was created for the 1985 local elections, where it contained five wards. Four of the wards came from the abolished Area C, which it effectively replaced, with the final ward, Blackstaff, coming from Area F. From the 1993 local elections to the 2011 elections, the area contained six wards, following the creation of the Musgrave ward. For the 2014 local elections, it lost the wards of Blackstaff and Windsor and gained the Belvoir ward, which had previously been part of the abolished Castlereagh Borough Council. This was as a result of the 2014 Local Government Reform.

Wards (1985–2011)

Councillors 

In May 2011, Councillors Tom Ekin, Ruth Patterson and Bob Stoker were appointed as Aldermen by Belfast City Council. Alderman Ruth Patterson also served as Deputy Lord Mayor, 2011–12, while Mairtin O'Muilleoir is serving as Lord Mayor for 2013–14.

2023 Elections 
2019: 2 x DUP, 1 x SDLP, 1 x Alliance, 1 x Sinn Fein

2023:

2019-2023 Change:

2019 Elections
2014: 1 x DUP, 1 x SDLP, 1 x Alliance, 1 x Sinn Fein, 1 x UUP

2019: 2 x DUP, 1 x SDLP, 1 x Alliance, 1 x Sinn Fein

2014-2019 Change: DUP gain from UUP

2014 Elections 
This election was carried out under new ward boundaries, as a result of local government reform.

2014: 1 x DUP, 1 x SDLP, 1 x Alliance, 1 x Sinn Fein, 1 x UUP

2011 Elections

See also
Belfast City Council
Electoral wards of Belfast
Local government in Northern Ireland
Members of Belfast City Council

References

Electoral wards of Belfast
1985 establishments in Northern Ireland